Jyotirishwar Thakur or   (1290–1350) was a Maithili     poet, playwright, musician and an early  Maithili and Sanskrit writer, known for the Varṇa Ratnākara, his encyclopedic work in Maithili.

Life 
Jyotirishwar was son of Rāmeśvara and grandson of Dhīreśvara. He was the court poet of King Harisimhadeva of the Karnat dynasty of Mithila (r. 1300–1324).

Major works
This work contains descriptions of various subjects and situations. This work provides valuable information about the life and culture of medieval India. An incomplete list of 84 Siddhas is found in the text, which consists only 76 names. A manuscript of this text is preserved in the Asiatic Society, Kolkata (ms. no 4834 of Asiatic Society of Bengal).

The play relates the contest between a religious mendicant  and his disciple  over a lovely courtesan   whom the Brahmin arbitrator  keeps for himself. Superior characters in this drama speak in Sanskrit, inferior characters speak in Prakrit and the songs are in Maithili. 

Notes

References
 Chatterji S.K. and S.K. Mishra (ed.)
 Majumdar, Ramesh Chandra; Pusalker, A. D.; Majumdar, A. K., eds. (1960). The History and Culture of the Indian People. VI: The Delhi Sultanate. Bombay: Bharatiya Vidya Bhavan.

External links
 The  text
  pdf
  
  
  

Maithili literature
People from Bihar
1350 deaths
1290 births